Arne Odd Skaare (16 January 1907 - 11 August 1981) was a Norwegian politician for the Conservative Party.

He served as a deputy representative to the Norwegian Parliament from Akershus during the term 1954–1957.

On the local level, Skaare was mayor of Asker municipality from 1956 to 1967.

References

1907 births
1981 deaths
Deputy members of the Storting
Conservative Party (Norway) politicians
Mayors of places in Akershus
Asker politicians